Peter Salzbacher (born 29 May 1946) is an Austrian rower. He competed in the men's coxed pair event at the 1964 Summer Olympics.

References

1946 births
Living people
Austrian male rowers
Olympic rowers of Austria
Rowers at the 1964 Summer Olympics
Place of birth missing (living people)